Yezova is a rural locality (a village) in Cherdynsky District, Perm Krai, Russia. The population was 60 as of 2010.

Geography 
Yezova is located 20 km north of Cherdyn (the district's administrative centre) by road. Vilgort is the nearest rural locality.

References 

Rural localities in Cherdynsky District